Reece Gold (born September 2, 2004) is an American racing driver. He currently competes in the Indy Pro 2000 Championship with Juncos Hollinger Racing. Gold has previously competed in the 2020 U.S. F2000 National Championship with Cape Motorsports, the 2019 U.S. F2000 National Championship with Cape Motorsports, and the 2019 Formula 4 United States Championship with Cape Motorsports.

Racing record

Career summary 

* Season still in progress.

American open-wheel racing results

Formula 4 United States Championship

U.S. F2000 National Championship 
(key) (Races in bold indicate pole position) (Races in italics indicate fastest lap) (Races with * indicate most race laps led)

Indy Pro 2000 Championship 
(key) (Races in bold indicate pole position) (Races in italics indicate fastest lap) (Races with * indicate most race laps led)

Indy NXT
(key) (Races in bold indicate pole position) (Races in italics indicate fastest lap) (Races with L indicate a race lap led) (Races with * indicate most race laps led)

* Season still in progress.

References

External links 
 
 Reece Gold career summary at DriverDB.com

2004 births
Racing drivers from Florida
Racing drivers from Miami
U.S. F2000 National Championship drivers
Indy Pro 2000 Championship drivers
Living people

Juncos Hollinger Racing drivers
Indy Lights drivers
United States F4 Championship drivers
NACAM F4 Championship drivers